Francisco Martínez Portusach (1864–1919) was a Spanish merchant and whaler who was briefly the Governor of Guam, before he was deposed. In the American media of the time, he was often referred to as Francisco Portusach or Frank Portusach.

Biography 
Portusach was born in Barcelona, Spain. His father was a wealthy merchant and Portusach spent his childhood on Spanish merchant ships in the Philippines and other Spanish territories. After the death of his father, he fell out of favor with his elder brother and moved to Chicago, Illinois in 1885 and became a United States citizen in 1888. Soon after, he moved to Tacoma, Washington and then to San Francisco, California where he met and married his American wife. Together, they moved to Guam, then a Spanish colonial territory.

On June 20, 1898, during the Spanish–American War, the United States captured Guam. The existing Spanish garrison, including Governor Juan Marina, were taken as prisoners of war to Manila. The existing Spanish citizens of the island were also disarmed. Captain Henry Glass, the commander of the battle appointed Portusach as the acting-Governor of Guam, to serve until a formal military garrison could be sent. Portusach's only qualification for the position was that he was the only American citizen living on the island.

With Glass and the United States Navy departed, Portusach was unable to solidify his position as governor and he was quickly overthrown by José Sisto, a Filipino Spaniard and the island Treasurer under Spanish rule. Sisto, too, would shortly be overthrown by the native Chamorro population. In January 1899, the USS Brutus arrived and reinstated Sisto – not Portusach – as governor.

In 1917, he wrote History of the Capture of Guam by the United States Man-of-War 'Charleston' and Its Transports.

See also 
 List of minority governors and lieutenant governors in the United States

References
"Spaniards Rise In Guam". New York Times. New York, N.Y.: Dec 31, 1898. pg. 1, 1 pgs
"Portusach Was Deposed." The Washington Post. Washington, D.C.: Dec 31, 1898. pg. 1, 1 pgs
"The Capture of the Island of Guam." Overland Monthly and Out West Magazine. San Francisco: Mar 1900. Vol.VOL. XXXV, Iss. No. 207;  pg. 225, 9 pgs
Spanish Empire Coins in Guam – Part Three
Spanish–American War bibliography by Navy.mil

1864 births
1919 deaths
Governors of Guam
Spanish emigrants to the United States
Guamanian people of Spanish descent
Spanish merchants
19th-century Spanish businesspeople